Rashid Ali Hadj Matumla (born June 26, 1968 in Tanga) is a retired male boxer from Tanzania, who represented his native East African country in three consecutive Summer Olympics, starting in 1988 (Seoul). He was nicknamed Snakeboy during his career. Matumla also competed at two Commonwealth Games: 1994 and 1998. Matumla now lives at Keko suburb in Dar es Salaam.

1996 Olympic results
Below is the record of Rashid Ali Hadj Matumla, a Tanzanian light welterweight boxer who competed at the 1996 Atlanta Olympics:

 Round of 32: lost to Phillip Boudreault (Canada) on points, 12-16.

See also
 Bruno Tarimo
 Goodluck Mrema

References
 Profile
 thecgf

External links
 

1968 births
Living people
People from Tanga, Tanzania
Tanzanian male boxers
Lightweight boxers
Light-welterweight boxers
Boxers at the 1988 Summer Olympics
Boxers at the 1992 Summer Olympics
Boxers at the 1996 Summer Olympics
Boxers at the 1994 Commonwealth Games
Boxers at the 1998 Commonwealth Games
Commonwealth Games competitors for Tanzania
Olympic boxers of Tanzania
Light-middleweight boxers
African Boxing Union champions
People from Tanga Region